Temple Dupree "T. J." Gibbs Jr. (born October 9, 1997) is an American professional basketball player who last played for Krka of the Slovenian League. He played college basketball for the Notre Dame Fighting Irish.

Early life and high school career
A native of Scotch Plains, New Jersey, Gibbs began playing basketball at the age of eight. In middle school, he scored 30 points in the first half of a tournament. Gibbs attended Seton Hall Prep. He averaged 18.6 points per game as a sophomore. Gibbs averaged 19.9 points, 4 rebounds, 3.2 assists and 1.7 steals per game as a junior, earning Second Team All-State recognition. As a senior, he averaged 20.6 points, 4.2 rebounds, 3.6 assists and 2.4 steals per game. Gibbs finished as Seton Hall Prep’s all-time leading scorer with 1,987 points. A consensus four-star recruit, he committed to playing college basketball for Notre Dame, choosing the Fighting Irish over offers from Seton Hall, Oklahoma, Rutgers, Providence, Georgetown and Boston College.

College career
As a freshman, Gibbs averaged 4.7 points and 1.7 assists per game. During the offseason, he focused on losing weight and improving his nutrition, working with conditioning coach Tony Rolinski. On February 6, 2018, he scored a career-high 28 points in a 96–85 win against Boston College. Gibbs became a primary scorer for Notre Dame as a sophomore due to injuries to Bonzie Colson and Matt Farrell. He averaged 15.3 points and 3 assists per game as a sophomore. Gibbs averaged 13.4 points, 3.4 assists, 1.2 steals per game as a junior. As a senior, Gibbs averaged 13.3 points, 3.3 assists and 2.2 rebounds per game.

Professional career
On August 19, 2021, Gibbs signed his first professional contract with Krka of the Slovenian League.

Career statistics

College

|-
| style="text-align:left;"| 2016–17
| style="text-align:left;"| Notre Dame
| 36 || 1 || 15.0 || .375 || .321 || .831 || 1.5 || 1.7 || .7 || .1 || 4.7
|-
| style="text-align:left;"| 2017–18
| style="text-align:left;"| Notre Dame
| 36 || 36 || 37.4 || .411 || .403 || .838 || 2.8 || 3.0 || 1.0 || .1 || 15.3
|-
| style="text-align:left;"| 2018–19
| style="text-align:left;"| Notre Dame
| 32 || 32 || 36.1 || .347 || .318 || .757 || 1.9 || 3.4 || 1.2 || .1 || 13.4
|-
| style="text-align:left;"| 2019–20
| style="text-align:left;"| Notre Dame
| 32 || 32 || 35.0 || .421 || .420 || .880 || 2.2 || 3.3 || 1.0 || .1 || 13.3
|- class="sortbottom"
| style="text-align:center;" colspan="2"| Career
| 136 || 101 || 30.6 || .390 || .373 || .821 || 2.1 || 2.8 || 1.0 || .1 || 11.6

Personal life
Gibbs is the son of Temple Gibbs Sr. His older brothers Ashton and Sterling are also professional basketball players. Growing up, they were forbidden from playing one-on-one after Ashton fouled T. J. and he needed stitches on his lip.

References

External links
Notre Dame Fighting Irish bio

1997 births
Living people
American expatriate basketball people in Slovenia
American men's basketball players
Basketball players from New Jersey
KK Krka players
Notre Dame Fighting Irish men's basketball players
People from Scotch Plains, New Jersey
Point guards
Seton Hall Preparatory School alumni
Sportspeople from Union County, New Jersey